Henderson Ridge is a ridge in the U.S. state of West Virginia.

The ridge was named after James Henderson, a pioneer settler.

References

Landforms of Monongalia County, West Virginia
Ridges of West Virginia